Hard Rock Hotel & Casino Sioux City is a casino hotel in Sioux City, Iowa. It is owned and operated by Churchill Downs, Inc.

History
The proposal for Hard Rock Casino Sioux City was announced in October 2012. The $100-million project would be developed by Warner Gaming, the operator of the Hard Rock Hotel & Casino Las Vegas. The plan was later modified to include a boutique hotel component. The Hard Rock was one of four applications submitted for the one available casino license in Woodbury County, competing against a bid from Ho-Chunk Inc. and two bids from Penn National Gaming. Peninsula Pacific Entertainment joined as an investor in the project in January 2013. In April 2013, the Iowa Racing and Gaming Commission selected the Hard Rock over the other proposals. 

The Hard Rock opened August 1, 2014 in downtown Sioux City. The casino is land-based, as Iowa no longer requires casinos to be built on riverboats. The opening came after some controversy from the now-defunct Argosy Casino Sioux City, who had its license revoked by the Iowa Racing & Gaming Commission in 2014.

Peninsula Pacific bought out Warner's stake in the property in 2020. In 2022, Peninsula Pacific sold the bulk of its assets, including the Hard Rock, to Churchill Downs, Inc.

Property information
The  gaming floor consists of over 850 slot machines and 25 table games. The hotel, housed in the historic Battery Building, has 54 rooms. There are three restaurants: the World Tour Buffet, Main + Abbey, and Fuel American Grill.
Sports betting was legalized in Iowa in August 2019, and Hard Rock began accepting bets on September 20, 2019.

See also
List of casinos in Iowa

References

External links

Casinos in Iowa
Sioux City, Iowa
Hard Rock Cafe
2014 establishments in Iowa
Casinos completed in 2014
Hotels established in 2014